Sharad Jagannath Diwadkar (11 January 1936, Bombay - 1 March 2005, Mumbai) was a Bombay cricketer. He was an off-spinning all-rounder who played 82 first class matches between 1957-58 and 1973-74.

Diwadkar's best match bowling figures were 11 for 146 (5 for 74 and 6 for 72), when he helped State Bank of India recover from a first-innings deficit to win the final of the 1966-67 Moin-ud-Dowlah Gold Cup Tournament over Indian Starlets by 16 runs. His best innings figures were 6 for 19, off 20 overs, when Bombay beat Saurashtra by an innings in the 1965-66 Ranji Trophy. He made his highest score of 177 in the Ranji Trophy final of 1963-64, when Bombay defeated Rajasthan.

References

External links
 Cricinfo Profile
 Cricketarchive Profile
 Makarand Waingankar, "This Jimmy couldn't play for India"

1936 births
2005 deaths
Indian cricketers
Mumbai cricketers